Kiromal Katibin (born ) is an Indonesian sport climber specializing in speed climbing. He is the current world record holder in speed climbing, with a time of 5.009 seconds recorded at 2022 IFSC Climbing World Cup in Chamonix, France in July 2022, and finished second overall in the men's speed category during the 2021 World Cup series. Katibin also has four career IFSC Climbing World Cup medals, all in speed.

Early life 
In 2007, Katibin saw sport climbing for the first time in a Batang city square during the Provincial Sports Week.

Since 2009, Katibin has been training with his brother. He was motivated to pursue sport climbing because he enjoyed meeting many friends, but he started winning national-level championships. His first medal was in the lead climbing competition at the 2011 National Championships. He also won the speed climbing gold medal at the 2016 National Championships and the speed climbing gold medal at the 2017 National Championships.

Career 

Katibin collected his first senior international medal, winning silver at the 2019 Asian Championships in Bogor, Indonesia.

On 28 May 2021, Katibin set a record for the fastest speed climbing in the world with a record of 5.25 seconds in the qualifying round of a IFSC World Cup event in Salt Lake City, United States. The record had been held by Reza Alipour who climbed in 5.48 seconds in 2017. He finished the competition with a silver medal, losing the same day in the final race to his compatriot Veddriq Leonardo, who set a new world record of 5.20 seconds. In July 2021, Katibin won a bronze at the Villars World Cup. He finished the 2021 World Cup series in second place overall.

On 6 May 2022, Katibin regained the world record from Leonardo with a 5.17-second run in the qualifying round of the World Cup event in Seoul, South Korea. On 27 May, he lowered his own world record with 5.10 seconds in the qualifying round of the World Cup event in Salt Lake City. On 30 June, he broke the record for the fourth time in the IFSC World Cup Villars qualifiers with 5.097 seconds and improved his record again later that day with a 5.04-second run. On 8 July, Katibin set the world record for the seventh time in 14 months with a time of 5.009 seconds at the Chamonix World Cup qualifying round.

In July 2022, Katibin won the silver medal at the World Games in Birmingham, Alabama, United States, losing to Leonardo in the final.

Achievements

World Games 
Men's speed

Asian Championships 
Men's speed

Men's speed relay

Asian Youth Championships 
Speed juniors

IFSC Climbing World Cup 
The IFSC Climbing World Cup is a series of climbing competitions held annually and organized by the International Federation of Sport Climbing (IFSC). The athletes compete in three disciplines: lead, bouldering and speed. The number of competitions and venues vary from year to year. The first World Cup was held in 1989, and included only lead climbing events. Speed climbing was introduced in 1998 and bouldering in 1999.

Men's speed

World records

Rankings

Climbing World Cup

Number of medals in the Climbing World Cup

Speed

References

External links

2000 births
Living people
Sportspeople from Central Java
Indonesian rock climbers
Sports world record holders
20th-century Indonesian people
21st-century Indonesian athletes
World Games silver medalists
Competitors at the 2022 World Games
Sport climbers at the 2018 Asian Games
IFSC Climbing World Cup overall medalists
Speed climbers